Scolops is a North American genus of dictyopharid planthoppers in the subfamily Dictyopharinae. There are over 30 described species in the genus Scolops.

Species

 Scolops abnormis Ball, 1902 c g b
 Scolops angustatus Uhler, 1876 c g b
 Scolops austrinus Breakey, 1929 c g
 Scolops californicus Lawson & Beamer, 1930 c g
 Scolops cockerelli (Fowler, 1904) c g b
 Scolops excultus Lawson & Beamer, 1930 c g b
 Scolops flavidus Breakey, 1929 c g
 Scolops fumidus (Uhler, 1891) c g
 Scolops graphicus Ball, 1930 c g
 Scolops grossus Uhler, 1876 c g b
 Scolops hesperius Uhler, 1876 c g b
 Scolops immanis Breakey, 1929 c g b
 Scolops luridus Breakey, 1929 c g
 Scolops maculosus Ball, 1902 c g
 Scolops neomexicanus Beamer & Lawson, 1930 c g
 Scolops nicholi Ball, 1937 c g
 Scolops osborni Ball, 1902 c g
 Scolops pallidus Uhler, 1900 c g b
 Scolops perdix Uhler, 1900 c g b
 Scolops pruinosus Breakey, 1929 c g
 Scolops pungens (Germar, 1830) c g b
 Scolops robustus Ball, 1902 c g
 Scolops snowi Breakey, 1929 c g
 Scolops socorroensis Lawson & Beamer, 1930 c g
 Scolops stonei Breakey, 1929 c g
 Scolops sulcipes (Say, 1825) c g b (the partridge bug)
 Scolops tanneri Ball, 1937 c g
 Scolops texanus Lawson & Beamer, 1930 c g b
 Scolops uhleri Ball, 1902 c g b
 Scolops vanduzeei Ball, 1902 c g
 Scolops virescens Ball, 1937 c g
 Scolops viridis Ball, 1902 c g

Data sources: i = ITIS, c = Catalogue of Life, g = GBIF, b = Bugguide.net

References

Further reading

External links

 

Auchenorrhyncha genera
Dictyopharinae